Sahel is an ecoclimatic and biogeographic transition zone in Africa.

Sahel may also refer to:

Geographic
 Sahel (Eritrea), a town
 Sahel, Larache, a town in Morocco
 Sahel, Mali, a commune
 Sahel, Tunisia, a region of that country
 Arbaa Sahel, a town in Morocco
 Khemis Sahel, a town in Morocco
 Maten al-Sahel, a village in Syria
 Oulad Hriz Sahel, a town in Morocco
 Sahel Borj, a village in Iran
 Sahel Oulad H'Riz, a town in Morocco
 Sahel Region, of Burkina Faso
 Sahel River, a river in Algeria
 Sahel Selim, a city in Egypt
 Northern coast of Egypt (or simply El Sahel), Egypt
 UAE

Sports
 Sahel SC (Kuwait), a Kuwaiti football club
 Sahel SC, a Nigerien football club
 Sahel FC, a Cameroonian football club
 Étoile du Sahel, a Tunisian sports club
 Shabab Al-Sahel, a Lebanese football club
 Al-Sahel FC, a Saudi football club
 Al-Sahel SC, a Syrian football club

Other uses
 Omran Sahel, an Iranian company
 Voix du Sahel, a national radio station of Niger
 Mostapha Sahel (1946–2012), Moroccan politician

See also 
 Sahil (name)